Ranko Đorđić (Serbian Cyrillic: Paнкo Ђopђић; born 1 January 1957) is a Bosnian-Herzegovinian football manager and former player.

Club career
After playing several years in Yugoslav First League clubs FK Željezničar Sarajevo and NK Čelik Zenica, in 1981 he moved to Red Star Belgrade where he would win the 1983-84 Yugoslav championship and the 1985 Yugoslav Cup. Afterwards, he moved abroad to Sweden and signed with IFK Norrköping, where he won the Swedish Cup in 1988 before leaving the club the same year.

He began his coaching career in 2001.

Personal life
His son, Bojan Djordjic is also a former footballer.

Honours 
IFK Norrköping

 Svenska Cupen: 1987–88

External sources

 Stats from Yugoslav leagues at Zerodic.

References

1957 births
Living people
Sportspeople from Zenica
Serbs of Bosnia and Herzegovina
Association football midfielders
Yugoslav footballers
FK Željezničar Sarajevo players
NK Čelik Zenica players
Red Star Belgrade footballers
IFK Norrköping players
Yugoslav First League players
Allsvenskan players
Yugoslav expatriate footballers
Expatriate footballers in Sweden
Yugoslav expatriate sportspeople in Sweden
Bosnia and Herzegovina football managers
Serbian football managers
Vasalunds IF managers
Bosnia and Herzegovina expatriate football managers
Expatriate football managers in Sweden
Bosnia and Herzegovina expatriate sportspeople in Sweden